The First ministry of Louis-Philippe was announced on 11 August 1830 by King Louis Philippe I two days after he had become king.
It replaced the Provisional Ministry announced on 1 August 1830. 
On 2 November 1830 it was replaced by the Cabinet of Jacques Laffitte.

Ministers
Louis Philippe did not designate a president of the council. Jacques-Charles Dupont de l'Eure, keeper of the seals as Minister of Justice, countersigned the ordinances issued by his colleagues. Victor de Broglie was president of the council of state.
The ministers were:

References

Sources

 

French governments
1830 establishments in France
1830 disestablishments in France
Cabinets established in 1830
Cabinets disestablished in 1830